Agonum dolens is a species of ground beetle in the Platyninae subfamily. The species is common throughout Eastern Europe and Central Asia.

Description
The body is bronze or bronze-black, legs are brownish-red. The third interval of elytron have three, rarely four pores. The prothorax is broad, and is transverse.

Ecology
Living on shores, especially on Warta river of Poland.

References

dolens
Beetles of Europe
Beetles described in 1827